Verkh-Slyudyanka is a rural locality (a selo) in Mikhaylovsky Selsoviet, Ust-Kalmansky District, Altai Krai, Russia. The population was 144 as of 2013. There are 3 streets.

Geography 
Verkh-Slyudyanka is located 61 km southeast of Ust-Kalmanka (the district's administrative centre) by road. Sibiryachikha and Beryozovka are the nearest rural localities.

References 

Rural localities in Ust-Kalmansky District